Erromenosteus is a genus of extinct, medium-sized brachythoracid arthrodire placoderm from the Late Frasnian of the Kellwasserkalk facies of Late Devonian Bad Wildungen and Bicken, Germany.

The various species had bullet-shaped heads, and curved, crushing jaws.

Species List
As was mentioned, all known species are from the German Kellwasserkalk facies.  Denison (1978) says that the various species need to be revised, as many of the species were originally described as specimens of other species. Obruchev (1932) and Miles (1969) placed Leiosteus (=Erromenosteus) within Pachyosteidae (before Pachyosteidae was merged into Selenosteidae).<ref name=Denison>{{cite book|last=Denison|first=Robert|title=Placodermi Volume 2 of Handbook of Paleoichthyology'''|year=1978|publisher=Gustav Fischer Verlag|location=Stuttgart New York|isbn=9780895740274}}</ref>  Now, though, Erromenosteus is considered a basal member of Dinichthyloidea.

Erromenosteus
 Erromenosteus lucifer, the type species.

Leiosteus
These species were originally classified within Leiosteus before the genus was synonymized with Erromenosteus.
 Erromenosteus concavus, known from several specimens, average skull length ranging from  - .
 Erromenosteus inflatus, this species was originally referred to as Coccosteus inflatus, then Brachydeirus inflatus, before being placed within Leiosteus.  The length of the holotype skull is 
 Erromenosteus platycephalus Denison (1978) notes that it has never been figured.

Paraleiosteus
 Erromenosteus diensti: its holotype was originally referred as a specimen of E. concavus (=Leiosteus concavus) by Gross (1932), but Stensiö erected a new genus, "Paraleiosteus''," for the specimen on account of differences seen in its scapulo-coracoid bone.

References

Arthrodires
Placoderms of Europe
Arthrodire genera